Ligny-lès-Aire is a commune in the Pas-de-Calais department in the Hauts-de-France region of France.

Geography

It is surrounded by the communes Westrehem, Rely and Auchy-au-Bois. Ligny-lès-Aire is located 20 km northwest of Bruay-la-Buissière, the largest city nearby.

Population

Places of interest
 The church of St. Pierre, dating from the sixteenth century.
 An ancient windmill.

See also
Communes of the Pas-de-Calais department

References

Lignylesaire